From Within may refer to:

Music
 From Within (album), by Anekdoten, 1999
 From Within, a 1972 expanded version of Soulful, a 1969 album by Dionne Warwick
 From Within A mid-1990s collaboration between techno musicians Richie Hawtin and Pete Namlook, also the title of three EPs they released

TV and film
 From Within (film), a 2008 American horror film directed by Phedon Papamichael
 "From Within" (The Outer Limits), a television episode